The 1885 Cincinnati football team was an American football team that represented the University of Cincinnati as an independent during the 1885 college football season. The team compiled a 1–0–1 record. Arch Carson was the team captain. The team had no head coach and played its home games at Union Ball Park in Cincinnati. In its inaugural season of college football, Cincinnati played two games against the Mount Auburn Athletic Club team with the games three weeks apart. 

Cincinnati did not play its first intercollegiate football game until three years later in December 1888.

Schedule

References

Cincinnati
Cincinnati Bearcats football seasons
College football undefeated seasons
Cincinnati football